Linda Jean Young (born 1952) is the Chief Mathematical Statistician and Director of Research and Development at the National Agricultural Statistics Service. Her research interests include integrating diverse data especially that involving spatial data, agricultural data, and statistical ecology.

Young earned BS and MS degrees in mathematics from West Texas State University in 1974 and 1976, respectively. She completed her PhD in 1981 from Oklahoma State University. Her dissertation, Estimation and Testing Procedures for the Parameters of the Negative Binomial Distribution, was supervised by John Leroy Folks. She has served on the faculty of three land grant institutions: Oklahoma State University, the University of Nebraska, and the University of Florida.

With Jerry H. Young, she is the author of the book Statistical Ecology: A Population Perspective (Kluwer, 1998).

She is a Fellow of the American Statistical Association, a Fellow of the American Association for the Advancement of Science, and an elected member of the International Statistical Institute.

References

External links

1952 births
Living people
American statisticians
Women statisticians
West Texas A&M University alumni
Oklahoma State University alumni
Oklahoma State University faculty
University of Nebraska faculty
University of Florida faculty
Elected Members of the International Statistical Institute
Fellows of the American Statistical Association
Date of birth missing (living people)